César Cernuda  was president of Microsoft Latin America and corporate vice president of Microsoft  and is President of NetApp.

Career 
Early in his career, Cernuda worked at Software AG and Banco 21. In 1997, he joined Microsoft Spain. During his career at Microsoft, Cernuda has served as the company's vice president of sales, marketing and services for Latin America. He became president of Microsoft's business in the Asia Pacific region in 2013. In 2014, he received the "100 Españoles" award given to Spaniards who achieve international recognition.

In June 2016, Microsoft appointed Cernuda as a corporate vice president and its president of Latin America, a position in which he oversees 2,500 employees, and 80,000 business partnerships. He is the first person of Spanish heritage to reach the level of corporate vice presidency in the company. Cernuda stated in October 2016 that he has three goals in this role: to make technology more integrated into daily life, to boost productivity in the workplace, and to promote smarter cloud storage. As part of his leadership style, he advocates for flexible work arrangements, and he does not have his own office or desk. In June 2018, ESIC Business & Marketing School awarded him an Aster Award for Best Professional Career.

On July 1, 2020, Cernuda joined NetApp as President

Personal life 

Cernuda holds a bachelor's degree in business administration and marketing from ESIC University and completed a Management Development Program at the IESE Business School at the University of Navarra in Spain. He has also completed the Leadership for Senior Executives program at the Harvard Business School. He is married and has two children.

References

External links 

People from Tampico, Tamaulipas
Microsoft employees
University of Navarra alumni
Living people
Year of birth missing (living people)